Admiral Baker may refer to:

Alan T. Baker (born 1956), U.S. Navy rear admiral
Sir Henry Baker, 2nd Baronet (1787–1859), British Royal Navy vice admiral
John Baker (Royal Navy officer) (1660–1716), British Royal Navy vice admiral
Stuart P. Baker (fl. 1980s–2020s), U.S. Navy rear admiral
Thomas Baker (Royal Navy officer) (1771–1845), British Royal Navy vice admiral
Wilder D. Baker (1890–1975), U.S. Navy vice admiral